Galka is a rural locality (a settlement) in Yayvinskoye Urban Settlement, Alexandrovsky District, Perm Krai, Russia. The population was 1 as of 2010. There is 1 street.

Geography 
Galka is located 37 km north of Alexandrovsk (the district's administrative centre) by road. Baza is the nearest rural locality.

References 

Rural localities in Alexandrovsky District